The braille alphabet used for the Kyrgyz language is based on Russian Braille, with a few additional letters found in the print Kyrgyz alphabet.

Alphabet 
Kyrgyz Braille uses the entire Russian Braille alphabet, though some letters are only found in loans and in addition has the letters ң, ө, ү.

Although the non-Russian letters ң, ө, ү are found in many other Cyrillic alphabets, their braille assignments are unrelated to those or with international norms. Compare the ң, ө, ү of Kazakh Braille, for example.

Punctuation
The question mark differs from Russian Braille.

Single punctuation:

Paired punctuation:

Formatting

See also 
Kyrgyz alphabets#Correspondence chart, for the braille alphabet aligned with the Cyrillic

References

 UNESCO (2013) World Braille Usage, 3rd edition.

French-ordered braille alphabets
Kyrgyz language